Richard Floyd Triptow Jr. (November 3, 1922 – February 20, 2015) was an American professional basketball player and coach.  At 6'0" and 170 pounds, he played as a guard and a forward.

Triptow attended Lane Tech High School and DePaul University, both in Chicago, Illinois.  From 1944 to 1949, he played professional basketball in the National Basketball League and National Basketball Association as a member of the Chicago American Gears, the Tri-Cities Blackhawks, the Fort Wayne Zollner Pistons, and the Baltimore Bullets.  Playing alongside George Mikan, Triptow won an NBL championship with the Gears in 1947.  Triptow coached the Lake Forest College men's basketball team from 1959 to 1973.

In 1997, Triptow wrote a book about his experiences with the Chicago American Gears, called The Dynasty That Never Was.

BAA/NBA career statistics

Regular season

External links

Association for Professional Basketball Research's NBL statistics - downloadable database

References

1922 births
2015 deaths
All-American college men's basketball players
American men's basketball coaches
American men's basketball players
Baltimore Bullets (1944–1954) players
Basketball coaches from Illinois
Basketball players from Chicago
Chicago American Gears players
College men's basketball head coaches in the United States
DePaul Blue Demons men's basketball players
Fort Wayne Pistons players
Fort Wayne Zollner Pistons players
Lake Forest Foresters men's basketball coaches
Professional Basketball League of America players
Shooting guards
Small forwards
Tri-Cities Blackhawks players